The Mangas Mountain Lookout Complex, on Mangas Mountain near Mangas, New Mexico, was built in 1934.  It was listed on the National Register of Historic Places in 1988.  The listing included one contributing building and one contributing structure.

It includes a fire lookout tower and a cabin or cottage.

photos only

References

Fire lookout towers on the National Register of Historic Places in New Mexico
National Register of Historic Places in Catron County, New Mexico
Buildings and structures completed in 1934
1934 establishments in New Mexico
Gila National Forest